Cassoneca  is a village located in Calomboloca commune, the municipality of Ícolo e Bengo, Luanda Province in Angola.

References

Communes in Luanda Province
Populated places in Luanda Province